George Washington Kipp (March 28, 1847July 24, 1911) was a Democratic member of the U.S. House of Representatives from Pennsylvania.

Biography
Kipp was born in Greene Township, Pike County, Pennsylvania. He engaged in the lumber business for thirty-five years. He served as a county commissioner of Wayne County, Pennsylvania, in 1880.

Kipp was elected as a Democrat to the Sixtieth Congress. He was not a candidate for renomination in 1908, as he instead chose to run for Pennsylvania State treasurer, for which he was unsuccessful.

He resumed his former business pursuits until the 1910 congressional election when he was once again elected, serving in the Sixty-second Congress until his death, on Vancouver Island, British Columbia. He was interred in Oak Hill Cemetery, Towanda, Pennsylvania.

See also
List of United States Congress members who died in office (1900–49)

Sources

The Political Graveyard
George W. Kipp, late a representative from Pennsylvania, Memorial addresses delivered in the House of Representatives and Senate frontispiece 1913

1847 births
1911 deaths
Democratic Party members of the United States House of Representatives from Pennsylvania
19th-century American politicians